Sanjay Karol (born: 23 August 1961) is a Judge of the Supreme Court of India. He is former Chief Justice of Patna High Court and Tripura High Court. He has also served as Judge and Acting Chief Justice of Himachal Pradesh High Court.

Career
Karol was born in Shimla in 1961. He passed from St. Edward's School, Shimla and graduated with History Honours from Government College, Sanjauli. Karol obtained a law degree from Faculty of law, Himachal Pradesh University and in 1983 he was enrolled as an advocate, practiced in various courts. He was appointed an additional judge of the Himachal Pradesh High Court and also served as Acting Chief Justice of the High Court from 25 April 2017. Justice Karol became the fourth Chief Justice of Tripura High Court on 14 November 2018. He was transferred as Chief Justice of Patna High Court on 11 November 2019.

References

1961 births
Living people
Indian judges
21st-century Indian judges
Judges of the Himachal Pradesh High Court
Chief Justices of the Tripura High Court
People from Himachal Pradesh
Himachal Pradesh University alumni